Iksan National Baseball Training Stadium is a baseball stadium in Iksan, South Korea.

Baseball venues in South Korea
KT Wiz
Sports venues completed in 2011
2011 establishments in South Korea